E. C. Glass High School is a public school in Lynchburg, Virginia. It was founded in 1871 as Lynchburg High School and was named for long-time Superintendent of Public Schools in Lynchburg, Edward Christian Glass.

Academics
E. C. Glass offers a range of Advanced Placement courses, including: AP Human Geography, AP World History, AP Research, AP American History, AP US & Comparative Government, AP Physics, AP Chemistry, AP Biology, AP Environmental Science, AP Computer Science, AP Calculus AB & BC, AP Statistics, AP Latin, AP German, AP Spanish, AP French, AP Language & Composition, AP English Literature, AP Art History, AP Music Theory, AP Macro and Micro Economics, AP European History, and AP Portfolio Art. E. C. Glass also offers a range of extra classes such as Drafting, Culinary Arts, and Personal Finance. These classes help students get a head start in the real world.

Some of the awards and recognition for E. C. Glass High School include:
 US Department of Education Blue Ribbon School 1983, 1993
 Redbook Magazine School Award 1996
 Newsweek Magazine, 2007 Ranked in Top Public High Schools
 Best Comprehensive High School in Virginia

Athletics
E. C. Glass has a rich athletic tradition.  Its football team competed in the Virginia High School State Championship Play-offs in 1925, 1930, 1933, 1938, 1972, 1974, 1976, 1977, 1988, 1991, 1992, and 1995, and the semi-finals game in 1993, 1994 and 2022.  The Hilltoppers won the State Championship in 1930, 1933, 1938, 1988 and finished as state runners-up in 1991 and 1992. .

Arts
Glass Theatre offers courses in acting and technical theater.  Under Jim Ackley, a graduate of the Virginia Military Institute, the program won four state theatre championships. They have been selected five times to perform on the Main Stage at the Educational Theatre Association national convention and have been named the national high school theatre champions twice by the American High School Theatre Festival. Glass Theatre has also represented the United States at the Edinburgh (Scotland) International Arts Festival Fringe five times where they have always received critical acclaim and performed to sold-out audiences. In 1991, the US Congress named the EC Glass Senior Acting drama class students the winners of the “Young Writers and Inventor’s Award” for their play Going Toward the Light, written under Mr. Ackley’s supervision.

In 2012, Mr. Ackley retired after 32 years at Glass, the longest-tenured drama teacher in the school's history.  Mr. E. Tom Harris served in the position for five years and was replaced in 2019 by EC Glass alumna and former Broadway and film actor, Allison Daugherty.

In 1926, E. C. Glass' literary magazine, Menagerie (formerly, The Critic), was the first to receive the Virginia High School League's Trophy Class award.

E. C. Glass also offers many classes in music. Glass's combined concert and chamber orchestra regularly travels to competitions and assessments around the region and consistently sends musicians to the All-Virginia Band and Orchestra event in Richmond.

Additionally, Glass has concert band, wind ensemble, percussion ensemble, and jazz band classes. The E. C. Glass Marching Band, called "The Pride of Old Dominion," performs at football games and competitions around the state. The school also boast an award winning Choral Department under the direction of Dr. Nancy Valk-Stalcup. Ensembles and classes within the Choral Department include the Chamber Singers, Concert Choir, Male Acapella Ensemble now the Acafellas, and the Acabellas.

Notable alumni

 Beth Behrs – actress, star of the CBS comedy 2 Broke Girls
 Connie Britton – actress, star of ABC's Nashville, NBC/Direct TV's Friday Night Lights
 Cornell Brown – former American football All-American linebacker of the National Football League. National Defensive Player of the Year at Virginia Tech. Baltimore Ravens 1997–2004. Super Bowl Champion 2001.
 Ruben Brown – former American football guard of the National Football League. Buffalo Bills, Chicago Bears 1995–2007. Nine-time Pro-Bowl Selection and four-time All-Pro Selection.
 Brad Butler – American football player of the National Football League. Drafted in the 5th Round of the 2006 NFL Draft to the Buffalo Bills. Four-year starter at the University of Virginia.
 Bill Chambers – record-setting collegiate basketball player for William & Mary
 Bill Chipley – NFL player
 Ken Clay, former MLB player (New York Yankees, Texas Rangers, Seattle Mariners)
 Mickey Fitzgerald, former NFL player 
 Paul Fitzgerald  - Broadway actor and film writer, director and actor. 
Josh Hall, former MLB player (Cincinnati Reds)
David Lee  - Award-winning co-creator of Cheers and Frasier,  writer of multiple critically-acclaimed Broadway musicals and Hollywood films and long-running TV series.  Currently, Managing Director of Endstation Theatre Company.
 Andy Oldham, United States Circuit Judge of the United States Court of Appeals for the Fifth Circuit 
 Anthony R. Parnther American conductor
 Mosby Perrow Jr. – Virginia state senator (1943–1964) and key figure in the state's abandonment of "Massive Resistance" to desegregation.
 Faith Prince – Broadway actress
 Sam Sloan – chess player, author and amateur lawyer.
 Kara Stein - American attorney appointed by President Barack Obama in 2013 to serve on the powerful five-member U.S. Securities and Exchange Commission (SEC), a position she held until 2019. Prior to that, she held the position of Chief Legal Aide to Democratic Senator Jack Reed of Rhode Island from 1999 to 2013, during which time she helped write the Dodd–Frank Wall Street Reform and Consumer Protection Act.
 Carl Anderson (singer)  - (February 27, 1945 – February 23, 2004) American singer, film and theater actor known for his soulful voice, his hit songs and his moving portrayal of Judas Iscariot in the Broadway and film versions of the rock opera Jesus Christ Superstar by Andrew Lloyd Webber and Tim Rice. In 1986, Anderson and singer-actress Gloria Loring joined for their harmonious duet Friends and Lovers (Gloria Loring and Carl Anderson song), which immediately reached No. 2 on the Billboard Hot 100 chart.
 Randall Wallace – American screenwriter, director, producer, and songwriter most notable for adapting Blind Harry's 15th century epic poem "The Actes and Deidis of the Illustre and Vallyeant Campioun Schir William Wallace" into his award-winning screenplay for the blockbuster film Braveheart
 John Coates - long-time and venerated Harvard Law professor

References

Public high schools in Virginia
Educational institutions established in 1871
Schools in Lynchburg, Virginia
1871 establishments in Virginia